The Aboño (historically Avono) is a river in northern Spain flowing through the Autonomous Community of Asturias.

References 

Rivers of Spain
Rivers of Asturias